Project 51O is a soccer club from Oakland, California competing in the Southwest Division of USL League Two. They are the reserve club of USL Championship club Oakland Roots SC. The name 51O is partly inspired by Oakland's 510 area code, although features the letter O in place of the number 0 to stand for "Oakland".

History
Oakland Roots SC launched their reserve club on December 9, 2019. The concept of Project 51O was based on Nike's Project 40, which ran from 1997 to 2005 and sought to develop the U.S. national team player pool. Project 51O will mirror parts of that development program, but with a community-based twist.

Originally set to compete in the National Premier Soccer League for the 2020 season, the team only played one match, a win over Napa Valley 1839 FC, before the season was halted and eventually cancelled due to the COVID-19 pandemic.

On September 17, 2020, the team announced it would compete in USL League Two beginning with the 2021 season. They later announced they would go on hiatus for that season along with the rest of the Southwest Division and begin League Two play in 2022. For the Fall 2021 season, they added a team in the United Premier Soccer League to allow for year-round development, while still remaining part of USL League Two.

Year-by-year

Honors

League
USL League Two
Southwest Division Champions: 2022
UPSL
NorCal Conference Champions: Fall 2022

References

USL League Two teams
Association football clubs established in 2019
Soccer clubs in Oakland, California
Sports teams in Oakland, California
Soccer clubs in California